Paris Hilton's Dubai BFF (2011) is a reality television series as well as the second and last spin-off of Paris Hilton's My New BFF (2008–2009) following Paris Hilton's British Best Friend (2009). The series chronicles 12 contestants living in Dubai competing for a chance to become Paris Hilton's best friend through a series of challenges. A total of 9 episodes were filmed, with Reem Al Alnezi being revealed as the winner in the finale.

Episodes

References

External links
Paris Hilton's My New BFF: Dubai (2009–2011) IMDb

Paris Hilton
Paris Hilton